Makoto Sasaki may refer to the following: